"Blues in My Heart" is a 1931 jazz standard. It was written by Benny Carter and Irving Mills.

Cover Versions
 Mildred Bailey - recorded on September 15, 1931 for Brunswick Records (catalog No. 6190).
 Fletcher Henderson and His Orchestra (1931).
 Ray Noble and His New Mayfair Dance Orchestra (vocal by Al Bowlly) recorded on February 12, 1932. (Al Bowlly discography)
 Lee Wiley - for the  album A Touch of the Blues (1958).
 Ace Cannon recorded a version on his debut 1962 album Tuff Sax.

See also
List of jazz standards

References

Songs about blues
1930s jazz standards
1931 songs
Cab Calloway songs